Epilobocera sinuatifrons  is a freshwater crab of the family Epiloboceridae. The species is widely distributed in streams of Puerto Rico and occurs also on Saint Croix (the U.S. Virgin Islands).

Epilobocera sinuatifrons is one of the most abundant predatory freshwater decapods in the freshwater streams of Puerto Rico. The juveniles are aquatic while the adults feed also on terrestrial resources on the forest floor adjacent to streams.

See also
 List of crustaceans of Puerto Rico

References

 

sinuatifrons
Freshwater crustaceans of North America
Crustaceans of Puerto Rico
Fauna of the United States Virgin Islands
Endemic fauna of the United States
Taxa named by Alphonse Milne-Edwards
Crustaceans described in 1866